Paul Grümmer (26 February 1879 – 30 October 1965) was a German-born cellist and teacher.

Grümmer was born in Gera in Thuringia. He studied at the Leipzig Conservatory with Julius Klengel.

He was well known as a member of the Busch Quartet, founded by Adolf Busch. He taught at the Vienna Conservatory, and his students include German-born conductor and cellist Nikolaus Harnoncourt and child prodigy Elsa Hilger.

Among his pedagogical works:

"Die Grundlage der Klassischen und Virtuosen Technik auf dem Violoncello" oder "Les Bases de la technique et de la virtuosité de violoncelle" ("The basis of the classical and virtuoso technique of cello playing"), Universal Edition, Vienna, 1942.

Harmonische neue tägliche Übungen : für Violoncello ("New harmonious daily exercises: for cello"), Bote & Bock, Berlin, 1954.

References 

 

1879 births
1965 deaths
German classical cellists
People from Gera